Mundathanam is a place in Kangazha Village,  Changanassery Taluk and Kottayam District of Kerala State in India. It is located in eastern part of Kottayam district and adjacent to Pathanamthitta district. It is well connected to Changanacherry. 
Mundathanam is famous for almost all Christian denominations and their churches.

The nearest railway stations are Kottayam (29 km) and Changanacherry (26 km) and Thiruvalla (26 Km) and the nearest Airport are Cochin Airport (Nedumbassery )  (105 km) and (Thiruvananthapuram) Airport 
(Trivandrum) (143 Km) away and (12 Km) away from proposed Sabari International Airport.

Nearest places
 Pathanadu 3 km 
 Kulathoormoozhi 4 km
 Manimala 12 km
 Karukachal12 Km
 Kottayam 29 Km
 Changanachery 26 Km
 Mallappally 9 Km
 Thiruvalla 26 Km

Culture 
The majority of the people are farmers. They cultivate rubber, black pepper, coffee, coconut trees and tapioca.

Healthcare
 Salvation Army Hospital Edayappara is the main healthcare center.
 Primary Health Centre Mundathanam

Educational institutions in Mundathanam
 C.M.S LP School, Mundathanam.
 N.M UP School.
 Bethany Christian English medium School.
 Little Flower Vidyanikethan & junior college, C.B.S.E , Mundathanam.

Economy 
The economy of Mundathanam is primarily from agriculture. Mundathanam is one of the rubber producing villages in Kerala because the hilly terrain, high humidity and good rain make it suitable for rubber cultivation. Other major crops are coconut, tapioca and pepper. NRIs are also another major source of income

Demographics 
As of 2011 India census, Mundathanam had a population of 1245 of which 578 are males and 667 are females

Climate 
Mundathanam experiences a tropical climate with sufficient rainfalls in the months of June, July, August and October. Average  precipitation here is 391.4 mm. Humidity rises during the months of March and April. Average annual temperature is 31.14°C. Temperature falls during the end of year. The place also receives locally developed thundershowers.

References

Villages in Kottayam district